Mount Binga is a rural locality in the Toowoomba Region, Queensland, Australia. In the  Mount Binga had a population of 67 people.

History 
The locality takes its name from the mountain, and is believed to be an Aboriginal word meaning ants.

Mount Binga Provisional School opened on 1919 and closed in 1922.

In the  Mount Binga had a population of 67 people.

On 1 February 2018, Mount Binga's postcode changed from 4306 to 4314.

References 

Toowoomba Region
Localities in Queensland